Rankovce is a village and municipality in Košice-okolie District in the Kosice Region of eastern Slovakia.

History
In historical records the village was first mentioned in 1332.

Geography
The village lies at an altitude of 364 metres and covers an area of 14.842 km². The municipality has a population of about 600 people.

References

External links

Villages and municipalities in Košice-okolie District
Romani communities in Slovakia